Bulgarian Summer (GPBL) is a political party and civic platform founded in 2021 by an initiative committee, headed by Boril Sokolov.

History 
The Bulgarian Summer civic platform emerged during the 2020 protests. It was officially established on January 3, 2021. The process was made entirely online due to the emergency pandemic situation and more than 900 people took part in the establishment. The party's registration in court has been challenged by the Prosecution, and due to this delay it failed to run in the April parliamentary elections. The Bulgarian National Unification was used as the mandator, winning 94,515 votes or 2.91%. In the early parliamentary elections in July, "Bulgarian Summer" officially appeared alone.

Electoral results 

 GPBL participated in the elections in April 2021 with the Bulgarian National Unification.

References

External links
Official site

2021 establishments in Bulgaria
Anti-corruption parties
Direct democracy parties
Organizations based in Sofia
Political parties established in 2021
Political parties in Bulgaria
Populist parties